One World Sports (stylized ONE World Sports) was an American sports-oriented cable and satellite television channel. Owned by One Media Corporation, which was led by Seamus O'Brien, the network was primarily devoted to international sports, including soccer, the England cricket team, KHL, the Champions Hockey League, and others. It was the main broadcaster of the New York Cosmos of the North American Soccer League, whose chairman was head of the network.

In March 2017, One World Sports was quietly shut down amid financial difficulties, and "certain distribution assets" of the network were sold to international broadcaster Eleven Sports, who replaced it in its channel allotments with the Eleven Sports Network.

History 
One World Sports was established in 2011 by One Media Corporation, a company led by Seamus O'Brien, chairman of the New York Cosmos of the NASL. The network acquired many of the sports rights formerly accumulated by the America One network.

In November 2016, the channel's staff was furloughed as a cost-cutting measure after it failed to receive a round of funding. It was also reported that the channel was exploring a possible sale. In March 2017, the channel was quietly replaced on television providers by a new channel branded as Eleven Sports Network. There were also allegations that the network was behind on paying the freelancers and other employees who worked for the channel.

On March 16, 2017, Eleven Sports, co-owned by Italian entrepreneur Andrea Radrizzani (stakeholder of Leeds United F.C., and executive of the sports marketing agency MP & Silva) and The Channel Company, officially announced that it had acquired "certain distribution assets" of One World Sports. The brand already operated networks in Belgium, Luxembourg, Poland, Singapore, and Taiwan. Financial details of the sale were not disclosed. The same day, the Cosmos announced a new regional television deal with MSG Network and CW flagship station WPIX.

In response to the unpaid One World Sports staff, Eleven's group marketing director Danny Menken emphasized they had only acquired the network's distribution assets and stated that "people that have issues with [OWS] have to contact management, but we have no shares or relationship beyond the acquisition of distribution assets." One World Sports has become the subject of multiple lawsuits over unpaid freelancers and subcontractors.

Programming

Former programming
Soccer
 AFC Asian Cup
 AFC Champions League
 AFC U-23 Championship
 Arsenal TV 
 F.C. Bayern Munich TV
 Miami FC national US broadcast rights, shared with WSFL who has regional rights
Ice hockey
 Kontinental Hockey League
 Champions Hockey League
Basketball
 Chinese Basketball Association
 Liga ACB
Baseball
 Home games of the Yomiuri Giants (Stopped covering before the start of the 2016 season)
Arena football
 China Arena Football League
Cricket
 England cricket team home matches, and surrounding editorial content from Sky Sports
 2015 Ashes series
 Hero Caribbean Premier League T20 (live and replay matches; replays shared with Willow)
Golf
 OneAsia Golf Tour
Table tennis
 ITTF Table Tennis Pro Series
Badminton
 BWF Badminton Super Series
Darts
 Grand Slam of Darts
Mixed martial arts
 Abu Dhabi Warriors Fighting Championship
Highlight shows and weekly series
 OneAsia Tour Golf Highlights
 England National Cricket Team Highlights
 Badminton World
 Football Asia
 The Football Review
 NASL Highlights
Soccer
 J1 League
 K League Classic
 Chinese Super League
 A-League
 Chelsea TV
 New York Cosmos
Rugby
 Top League
 PRO Rugby
Field hockey
 Hockey India League
Aquatics
 Aquatic Super Series

On air talent
 Steve Cangialosi - Hockey, Soccer
 Ed Cohen - Baseball, Basketball, Hockey, Soccer
 Mike Crispino - Baseball, Basketball, Hockey, Soccer
 JP Dellacamera - NY Cosmos and Asian Cup Soccer
 Hunter Freeman - NY Cosmos and Asian Cup Soccer
 Keith Irizarry - Baseball, Basketball, Hockey
 Tom Laidlaw - Hockey Analyst
 Dave Leno - Baseball, Hockey
 Matt Martucci - Baseball
 Shep Messing - NY Cosmos and Asian Cup Soccer
 Jon Meterperel - Baseball, Basketball, Hockey
 Janusz Michallik - NY Cosmos Soccer
 Vin Parise - Basketball Analyst
 Mike Petke - NY Cosmos Soccer
 Bill Spaulding - Baseball, Basketball, Hockey

See also
 America One

References

Television channels and stations established in 2011
Television channels and stations disestablished in 2017
Sports television networks in the United States
Defunct television networks in the United States